Sumter Airport  is a public use airport located four nautical miles (7 km) north of the central business district of Sumter, a city in Sumter County, South Carolina, United States.  The airport is owned and operated by the Sumter County under an Airport Commission structure and has a county appointed airport manager, Jeff Knauer. 

Although most U.S. airports use the same three-letter location identifier for the FAA and IATA, this airport is assigned SMS by the FAA and SUM by the IATA (which assigned SMS to Sainte Marie Airport in Sainte-Marie, Madagascar).

Facilities and aircraft 
It has two runways: 5/23 is 5,501 by 100 feet (1,677 x 30 m) with an asphalt surface; 14/32 is 3,081 by 120 feet (939 x 37 m) with a turf surface.

For the 12-month period ending August 15, 2008, the airport had 48,300 aircraft operations, an average of 132 per day: 97% general aviation, 2% air taxi and 1% military. At that time there were 55 aircraft based at this airport: 85% single-engine and 15% multi-engine.

References

External links 
 Sumter Airport (SMS) airport data from South Carolina Division of Aeronautics
 IFR aircraft movements from South Carolina Division of Aeronautics
 

Airports in South Carolina
Buildings and structures in Sumter County, South Carolina
Transportation in Sumter County, South Carolina